José Elías Rauda Gutiérrez O.F.M. (born 20 July 1962) is a Salvadorian Roman Catholic bishop, being the bishop of the Diocese of San Vicente since 2009. He was previously the auxiliary bishop of Santa Ana and titular bishop of Foratiana from 2008 to 2009.

Biography
Rauda Gutiérrez was born in Agua Caliente, El Salvador, in 1962. He joined the Order of Friars Minor in his teens, and took his solemn vows on 28 February 1987. On 1 April 1989 he was ordained a priest. On 25 January 2008 it was announced that Rauda Gutiérrez had been appointed by Pope Benedict XVI as the auxiliary bishop for the Roman Catholic Diocese of Santa Ana and titular bishop of Foratiana. He was ordained a bishop on 19 April 2008 by Luigi Pezzuto. On 12 December 2009 it was announced that Rauda Gutiérrez would be the new bishop of San Vicente, succeeding José Luis Escobar Alas who had been appointed as the new archbishop of San Salvador.

As bishop, Rauda Gutiérrez has maintained close ties to the Salvadoran American community, visiting the United States on multiple occasions.

In 2018 Rauda Gutiérrez caused some controversy when he led a prayer at a meeting of the conservative party ARENA. Rauda Gutiérrez later said that he had been invited to give a prayer by the party president, and that he was not formally endorsing the political party.

References

1962 births
Living people
People from Chalatenango Department
Franciscan bishops
21st-century Roman Catholic bishops in El Salvador
Roman Catholic bishops of San Vicente